The 2019–20 Delaware State Hornets men's basketball team represented Delaware State University in the 2019–20 NCAA Division I men's basketball season. The Hornets, led by second-year head coach Eric Skeeters, played their home games at Memorial Hall in Dover, Delaware as members of the Mid-Eastern Athletic Conference. They finished the season 6–26, 4–12 in MEAC play to finish in a tie for ninth place. As the No. 8 seed in the MEAC tournament, they beat Maryland Eastern Shore in the first round before losing to North Carolina Central.

Previous season
The Hornets finished the 2018–19 season 6–25, 2–14 in MEAC play to finish in last place. In the MEAC tournament, they upset Savannah State in the first round, before falling to North Carolina Central in the quarterfinals.

Roster

Schedule and results

|-
!colspan=12 style=| Non-conference regular season

|-
!colspan=9 style=| MEAC regular season

|-
!colspan=12 style=| MEAC tournament
|-

|-

Source

References

Delaware State Hornets men's basketball seasons
Delaware State Hornets
Delaware State men's basketball
Delaware State men's basketball